In enzymology, a deoxycytidine deaminase is an enzyme that catalyzes the chemical reaction

deoxycytidine + H2O  deoxyuridine + NH3

Thus, the two substrates of this enzyme are deoxycytidine and H2O, whereas its two products are deoxyuridine and NH3.

This enzyme belongs to the family of hydrolases, those acting on carbon-nitrogen bonds other than peptide bonds, specifically in cyclic amidines.  The systematic name of this enzyme class is cytidine/2'-deoxycytidine aminohydrolase. This enzyme participates in pyrimidine metabolism. As every deoxycytidine deaminase is also a cytidine deaminase, they share the same EC number. The recommended name assigned by the IUBMB is cytidine deaminase.

References

 

EC 3.5.4
Enzymes of unknown structure